Qasımbəyli (also, Kasymbeyli) is a village and municipality in the Goranboy Rayon of Azerbaijan.  It has a population of 387.

External links 

Populated places in Goranboy District